Cora E. (born Sylvia Macco; 1968 in Kiel, West Germany) is a former nurse turned hip-hop artist who emerged in the early underground  German hip hop culture. At the time that she came to prominence, she was not only one of the originators, but she was also one of the few females in the industry.  She was one of the very few old-school acts to be taken on by a major record label after she released two singles with Buback record company.  She wrote her own lyrics, and worked independently. Many pegged her as a rapper but she called herself a "hip hopper."  Despite this, she and another traditionalist group Advanced Chemistry insisted that rap and hip-hop are inseparable. The social criticisms based on personal experience in her music link her to other hip-hop artists in Germany, such as Advanced Chemistry. Her old school sound interested EMI; they signed her and another female artist, Tic Tac Toe.  She had success with the record company and her first single Schlüsselkind (Latchkey Kid) was a hit.

Her first single with EMI, "Schlüsselkind" (Latchkey Kid), was released in December 1996 and was able to achieve wide airplay. The song featured a relatively unpolished production style and traditional delivery, with lyrics that attempted at social criticism via her personal experience by linking a description of her own childhood to the problems of children of working parents. Cora E. was the only female rap star who wrote all of her own lyrics.  The song was a tribute to the transformative power of hip-hop and directly refers to its country of origin, the United States:

References

German rappers
German women rappers
Living people
Musicians from Kiel
1968 births